Michael Nip Hall (born 12 June 1953) is an American-Swiss molecular biologist and professor at the Biozentrum of the University of Basel, Switzerland. He discovered TOR, a protein central for regulating cell growth.

Early life and education 
Hall was born in Puerto Rico. His parents liked Latin American culture, so they moved to Peru when he was three years old, and then to Venezuela a few years later. When Hall was 13, he went to the United States for boarding school, at St. Mark's School in Southborough, Massachusetts.

Hall entered the University of North Carolina at Chapel Hill as an arts major, but switched to zoology as he wanted to study medicine, earning his BSc in 1976. He found out he was not attracted to medicine after working at a local hospital, and turned to research when working on his undergraduate honors thesis in a molecular genetics laboratory. Hall obtained his PhD from Harvard University in 1981.

Career 
Hall has been intrigued with the research of François Jacob and Jacques Monod with bacterial genetics, and so he went to the Pasteur Institute in Paris as a research fellow in 1981 for eight months. He then joined Ira Herskowitz's group at the University of California, San Francisco as a postdoctoral fellow. He became a principal investigator in 1984, leading his own research group.

In 1987, Hall moved to Basel, Switzerland, and joined the Division of Biochemistry of the Biozentrum, University of Basel, as an assistant professor. He was promoted to professor in 1992.

Hall was twice appointed Vice Director of the Biozentrum, from 2002 to 2009 and again from 2013 to 2016. He was also Chairman of the European Molecular Biology Organization Council between 2021 and 2022, and served on the Council from 2017 to 2019 and again from 2020 to 2022.

Currently, Hall serves on the Board of Trustees of the Louis-Jeantet Foundation.

Research 

Hall is a pioneer in the fields of the PI3K/AKT/mTOR pathway and cell growth control, and is best known for discovering mTOR. In 1991, Hall seminally discovered two genes that, when mutated, made rapamycin unable to inhibit cell growth in yeasts. Hall named them TOR1 and TOR2, short for "Target of Rapamycin", which his group also sequenced and characterized.

Three years later, Stuart Schreiber identified the mammalian counterpart of TOR, known as the "mammalian target of rapamycin" (mTOR). The gene and the protein it encodes are later renamed the "mechanistic target of rapamycin", while the short form remains mTOR.

The protein encoded by the TOR (and mTOR) gene is a protein kinase activated by growth factors, nutrients, and insulin. It is a central controller of cell growth and metabolism. The TOR protein plays a key role in aging and the development of diseases such as cancer, obesity, diabetes, and cardiovascular disease.

After the discovery of TOR, Hall continued studying the function and regulation of TOR and mTOR in yeasts and humans. His group was the first to recognize that yeast TOR1 and TOR2 proteins can form two protein complexes (known as TORC1 and TORC2) with distinct function and composition. They went on to show the mammalian counterpart of TORC2 (named mTORC2) is not inhibited by rapamycin and regulates a different signalling pathway from mTORC1.

Hall also identified many roles of mTORC1 and mTORC2, including ribosomes physically interact with and activate mTORC2, glutamine breakdown stimulates mTORC1, and mTORC2 promotes lipid synthesis and cancer. Collaborating with Nenad Ban and Timm Maier, Hall reported the structures of mTORC1 in 2016 and mTORC2 in 2018.

Awards and honors 
 Member of the European Molecular Biology Organization (1995)
 Cloëtta Prize (2003)
 Fellow of the American Association for the Advancement of Science (2009)
 Louis-Jeantet Prize for Medicine (2009)
 Marcel Benoist Prize (2012)
 Member of the Swiss Academy of Medical Sciences (2013)
 Sir Hans Krebs Medal (2014)
 Breakthrough Prize in Life Sciences (2014)
 Member of the National Academy of Sciences (2014)
 Canada Gairdner International Award (2015)
 Debrecen Award for Molecular Medicine (2016)
 Szent-Györgyi Prize (2017)
 Albert Lasker Award for Basic Medical Research (2017)
 HFSP Nakasone Award (2019)
 BBVA Foundation Frontiers of Knowledge Award (2019)
 Sjöberg Prize (2020)

References 

1953 births
Living people
St. Mark's School (Massachusetts) alumni
University of California, San Francisco alumni
Fellows of the American Association for the Advancement of Science
Harvard University alumni
University of North Carolina at Chapel Hill alumni
Members of the European Molecular Biology Organization
Members of the United States National Academy of Sciences
Biozentrum University of Basel
Pasteur Institute
Academic staff of the University of Basel
University of California, San Francisco staff
Recipients of the Albert Lasker Award for Basic Medical Research
American emigrants to Switzerland